Wells Fargo Center is a twin tower skyscraper complex in Downtown Los Angeles on Bunker Hill, in Los Angeles, California. It comprises South and North towers, which are joined by a three-story glass atrium.

The project received the 1986–1987 and 2003–2004 Building Owners and Managers Association (BOMA) Office Building of the Year Award, and numerous others. A branch of the Wells Fargo History Museum is located at the center.

Wells Fargo Tower
Wells Fargo Tower (Tower I), at  it is the tallest building of the complex. It has 54 floors and it is the 8th tallest building in Los Angeles, and the 92nd-tallest building in the United States. When it opened in 1983, it was known as the Crocker Tower, named after San Francisco-based Crocker National Bank. Crocker merged with Wells Fargo in 1986.

During initial construction it was featured in the 1983 film, Blue Thunder. The top upper floors were not completed at the time of filming, so Roy Scheider's character shot a helicopter chasing him and the pilot ejects and drifts by the Crocker Center under construction and lands in the street. It was actually the base jumper Carl Boenish (1941–1984), off the Crocker Tower that performed the jump without permission on November 9, 1981, and it was front page news in the Los Angeles Times with photography from several angles.

Anchor tenants
 Wells Fargo Bank (Floors 1,5,7,9,11,12)
 Payden & Rygel (Floors 31–32)
 Gibson, Dunn & Crutcher (Floors 44–54)
 Oaktree Capital Management (Floors 23–25, 27–30, 34)

South Tower
It is the 17th tallest building in the city.

Anchor tenants
 Latham & Watkins (Floors 1–11,14)
 Lago (Floor 7)
 Reed Smith (Floors 28-30)
 The Boston Consulting Group (Floors 31-32)
 Munger, Tolles & Olson (Floors 34–39)

Fredric Jameson
Cultural critic Fredric Jameson used Skidmore, Owings and Merrill's Crocker Bank Center (as it was then named) as an example of what he sees as Postmodern architecture's "depthlessness":

See also
List of tallest buildings in Los Angeles
List of tallest buildings in the United States

References

Further reading
 

Skyscraper office buildings in Los Angeles
Bank buildings in California
Buildings and structures in Downtown Los Angeles
Bunker Hill, Los Angeles
Twin towers
Buildings and structures completed in 1983
1983 establishments in California
1980s architecture in the United States
Wells Fargo buildings
Postmodern architecture in California
Leadership in Energy and Environmental Design gold certified buildings